Mark Garnett is a senior lecturer at the Department of Politics Philosophy and Religion at Lancaster University and author of many books and articles covering post-1945 British politics.

Garnett was educated at Gosforth High School, Newcastle, and Durham University (Grey College).

He now has two children; Amelia, who was born on 26 April 2004, and Ben, who was born on 28 August. He also has a partner, Dili Satha.

With Ian Aitken, he was the authorised biographer of Conservative politician William Whitelaw.

Works
(with Ian Gilmour), Whatever Happened to the Tories? (London: Fourth Estate, 1997).
(with Andrew Denham), Keith Joseph: A Life (London: Acumen Press, 2001).
(with Ian Aitken), Splendid! Splendid! The Authorised Biography of Willie Whitelaw (London: Jonathan Cape, 2002).
(with P. Lynch), UK Government and Politics (London: Philip Allan, 2005).
Principles and Politics in Contemporary Britain (Exeter: Imprint Academic, 2006).
From Anger to Apathy: The British Experience since 1975 (London: Jonathan Cape, 2007).
Exploring British Politics (Harlow: Pearson Longman, 2007).
(with K. Hickson), Conservative Thinkers: The Key Contributors to the Political Thought of the Modern Conservative Party (Manchester: Manchester University Press, 2009).
(with P. Dorey and Andrew Denham), From Crisis to Coalition: the Conservative Party, 1997-2010 (Basingstoke: Palgrave Macmillan, 2011).
(with P. Lynch), Exploring British Politics. Third Edition (Harlow: Pearson Longman, 2012).
(with M. Johnson and D. Walker), Conservatism and Ideology (London: Routledge, 2015).
(with Paul Wetherly), Political Ideologies (Oxford University Press, 2017).
(with S. Mabon and R. Smith), ' 'British Foreign Policy Since 1945' ' (London: Routledge, forthcoming).

Notes

Year of birth missing (living people)
Living people
English biographers
Academics of Lancaster University
Alumni of Grey College, Durham